Pyrearinus is a genus of click beetle (family Elateridae).

List of species
 Pyrearinus acutus (Candèze, 1863) Colombia
 Pyrearinus adustus Costa, 1978 Brazil
 Pyrearinus alvarengai (Cobos, 1959) Argentina; Brazil
 Pyrearinus amplicollis (Candèze, 1863) French Guiana
 Pyrearinus baliolus Costa, 1978 Uruguay
 Pyrearinus basalis (Schwarz, 1902) Ecuador
 Pyrearinus brevicollis (Eschscholtz, 1829)
 Pyrearinus brunneus Costa, 1978 Argentina
 Pyrearinus candelarius (Germar, 1841) Brazil, Argentina
 Pyrearinus candens (Germar, 1841) Brazil
 Pyrearinus castaneus Costa, 1978 Brazil
 Pyrearinus cereus Costa, 1978 Brazil
 Pyrearinus cinerarius (Germar, 1841) Brazil
 Pyrearinus cinnameus Costa, 1978 Brazil
 Pyrearinus coctilis Costa, 1978 Brazil
 Pyrearinus commissator (Germar, 1841) Brazil
 Pyrearinus depressicollis (Blanchard, 1843) Bolivia
 Pyrearinus ferrugineus Costa, 1978 Brazil
 Pyrearinus flatus Costa, 1978 Brazil
 Pyrearinus fragilis Costa, 1978 Brazil
 Pyrearinus fulgurans (Candèze, 1865) French Guiana
 Pyrearinus fulvescens Costa, 1978 Brazil
 Pyrearinus fulvus Costa, 1978 Brazil
 Pyrearinus gibbicollis (Blanchard, 1843) Argentina
 Pyrearinus janus (Herbst, 1806) Brazil
 Pyrearinus lampadion (Illiger, 1807) Brazil
 Pyrearinus lampyris (Candèze, 1863) Brazil
 Pyrearinus latus Costa, 1978 Brazil
 Pyrearinus lineatus (Candèze, 1863) Paraguay
 Pyrearinus lucernulus (Illiger, 1807) Brazil Argentina
 Pyrearinus lucidulus (Illiger, 1807) Peru
 Pyrearinus lucificus (Germar, 1841) Brazil
 Pyrearinus luscinus Costa, 1978 Brazil
 Pyrearinus micatus Costa, 1978 Brazil
 Pyrearinus nictitans (Illiger, 1807) Brazil
 Pyrearinus nyctolampis (Germar, 1841) Brazil
 Pyrearinus nyctophilus (Germar, 1841) Brazil
 Pyrearinus pumilus (Candèze, 1863) Brazil
 Pyrearinus pusillus Costa, 1978 Paraguay
 Pyrearinus retrospiciens (Illiger, 1807) Brazil
 Pyrearinus ruscus Costa, 1978 Brazil
 Pyrearinus scintillula (Candèze, 1881) Brazil
 Pyrearinus termitilluminans Costa, 1982 Brazil
 Pyrearinus vesculus Costa, 1978 Brazil
 Pyrearinus vescus Costa, 1978 Brazil
 Pyrearinus vitticollis (Germar, 1841) Brazil

References 

  Elateridae in SYNOPSIS OF THE DESCRIBED COLEOPTERA OF THE WORLD

Elateridae genera
Bioluminescent insects